Nicolas Metzdorf (born 20 May 1988) is a French politician from Générations NC who has represented the 2nd constituency of New Caledonia in the National Assembly since 2022.

See also 

 List of deputies of the 16th National Assembly of France

References 

Living people

1988 births
Deputies of the 16th National Assembly of the French Fifth Republic
21st-century French politicians
Members of Parliament for New Caledonia
University of Strasbourg alumni
Members of the Congress of New Caledonia